Inquisitor powelli is an extinct species of sea snail, a marine gastropod mollusk in the family Pseudomelatomidae, the turrids and allies.

Description
The length (estimated) attains 22 mm, its diameter 6 mm.

Distribution
This extinct marine species was found in New Zealand.

References

 Dell, R. K. "A Tertiary molluscan fauna from Waikowhai, Manukau Harbour, Auckland." Dominion Museum records in zoology 1 (1950): 29–37.
 Maxwell, P.A. (2009). Cenozoic Mollusca. pp 232–254 in Gordon, D.P. (ed.) New Zealand inventory of biodiversity. Volume one. Kingdom Animalia: Radiata, Lophotrochozoa, Deuterostomia. Canterbury University Press, Christchurch

External links
 P. Vella, Tertiary Mollusca from South-East Wairarapa; Transactions and Proceedings of the Royal Society of New Zealand vol. 81, 1953
 Museum of New Zealand: Inquisitor powelli

powelli
Gastropods described in 1950